Trithionate is an oxyanion of sulfur with the chemical formula . It is the conjugate base of trithionic acid. Dilute sodium hydroxide hydrolyzes  as follows, yielding sodium thiosulfate and sodium trithionate:

2  + 6 NaOH + 9  →  + 2  + 8 

Certain sulfate-reducing bacteria have been known to use the compound in respiration.

References 

Sulfur oxoacids